Jehaq (also known as Jehaq-e Pā’īn and Jehaq Pā’īn) is a village in Khorram Dasht Rural District, in the Central District of Kashan County, Isfahan Province, Iran. At the 2006 census, its population was 60, in 36 families.

References 

Populated places in Kashan County